Rattlesnake Station was a stagecoach station northeast of Mountain Home, Idaho, and the original site of the Mountain Home post office. Approximately seven miles from exit 95 on Interstate 84 in present-day Elmore County, a historical marker located at milepost 102.7 on U.S. Route 20 commemorates its location.

History 
Rattlesnake Station was established in 1864 by Ben Holladay as a stop on his new Overland Stage Line between Salt Lake City, Utah, and Walla Walla, Washington.

The Overland line was acquired by the Northwestern Stage Company in 1870, which made the station a stop for its weekly stage line from Boise to the South Boise mines and an overnight stop in 1875.

A post office named "Mountain Home" was established in 1876 at Rattlesnake Station. Fire destroyed several station buildings on October 12, 1878, but were rebuilt and continued to serve stages until 1914, when the route was abandoned.

References

External links

 Roadside historical marker - Rattlesnake Station at Idaho Transportation Department
 You Tube.com - Rattlesnake Station, Idaho

Buildings and structures in Elmore County, Idaho
Stagecoach stations in Idaho
1864 establishments in Idaho Territory
1914 disestablishments in Idaho
Pre-statehood history of Idaho
American frontier
Former post office buildings
Overland Trail
Stagecoach stations on the National Register of Historic Places in Wyoming